Ajaaib is a 2000 Maldivian drama film written and directed by Haajara Abdul Kareem. Produced by Hussain Rasheed under Farivaa Films, the film stars Ahmed Asim, Mariyam Nazima, Koyya Hassan Manik and Waleedha Waleed in pivotal roles. It was released on 10 April 2000.

Plotline
Aadhanu (Koyya Hassan Manik), happily married to Mareena (Sakeena Dhon Ali) and living with their two children, decides to relocate himself to Male' in order to acquire some funds needed to renovate his house. Rasheedha (Waleedha Waleed), a divorcee who is looking after her aged mother, Aisa Manike (Haajara Abdul Kareem) allows him to stay at her house as a tenant. Aadhanu and Rasheedha marries on Mareena's approval though Mareena's mother (Haajara Abdul Kareem) tried to talk her out of it.

Cast 
 Ahmed Asim as Ahmed
 Mariyam Nazima as Sama
 Koyya Hassan Manik as Aadhanu
 Chilhiya Moosa Manik as Iburey
 Waleedha Waleed as Rasheedha
 Sakeena Dhon Ali as Mareena
 Haajara Abdul Kareem as Aisa Manike / Mareena's mother
 Aiminaidhee as Waheedha
 Mohamed Abdulla
 Sithi Fulhu as Dhaleyka
 Aishath Gulfa as Mariyam
 Mohamed Rasheed
 Ali Manik
 Abdulla Naseer

Soundtrack

References

2000 films
2000 drama films
Maldivian drama films
Dhivehi-language films